Chlorogonium is a genus of green algae in the family Haematococcaceae. This alga has a notable mutualistic relationship with the American toad, allowing the tadpoles to develop faster when covered with Chlorogonium.

See also
Oophila amblystomatis, a similar amphibian mutualistic alga

References

Chlamydomonadales
Chlamydomonadales genera
Taxa named by Christian Gottfried Ehrenberg